Geelong Supercats is a NBL1 South club based in Geelong, Victoria. The club fields a team in both the Men's and Women's NBL1 South. The club is affiliated with Basketball Geelong and Geelong United Basketball. The Supercats play their home games at Geelong Arena.

Club history

Men's team

Early years
The birth of the Geelong Basketball Club took place when a group of local basketball officials decided to look for a greater challenge. Officials of the Geelong Amateur Basketball Association felt that Geelong should be represented in the top Victorian competition, the VBA. For many years, Geelong's top players had played with leading clubs in Melbourne. So in late 1977, a group of Geelong men banded together and formed the GBC to give local basketballers the opportunity of playing top-level competition without the inconvenience of having to travel to Melbourne for practice session.

The club wanted to achieve the highest possible results on the court, so its founders believed the best way was to be successful off the court as well. Also the club wanted to be in the top half of the VBA ladder, not down the bottom. The club finished sixth in the 1978 Victorian Championship and fifth in season 1979.

Season 1980 was a successful year for the club. An extensive recruiting campaign saw the signings of Cal Bruton, Steven Kelocinski and Ray Shirley. That year, the side won three major tournaments and had victories over touring American College teams, University of Puget Sound and Oklahoma State. The side was also runners-up in the VBA championships. In 1981, the GBC took part in a new competition, the South Eastern Basketball League (SEBL), as well as the Victorian championships. The Geelong Cats went on to win the inaugural SEBL crown in 1981 with a 97–88 win over Frankston in the grand final. By winning the SEBL, Geelong was invited to compete in the Converse Super Challenge in Adelaide against Launceston (1981 national league winners), West Adelaide (No. 1 team in South Australia), and St Kilda (Australia's representative in the world championships in Brazil). Geelong emerged victors of the Super Challenge. The club was also the Victorian Summer Championship Premiers with a resounding victory over the national league team Nunawading. With the victory, Geelong was accepted into the National Basketball League (NBL).

NBL years
1982 saw the Cats finish runners-up in the NBL. Dubbed the Cinderella side of the NBL, Geelong almost set a new record for the number of successive wins. NBL Coach of the Year, Cal Bruton, revved up the Cats for 13 straight wins, falling by a game to equal St Kilda's record of 14 straight in the NBL's inaugural year. The Cats finished second on the ladder after the home-and-away rounds and eventually lost in the NBL Grand Final to the West Adelaide Bearcats 80–74 after having trailed by 22 points.

The Cats were one of the dominant forces in the NBL over the succeeding two years, finishing on top of the NBL's Western Division both years, but the NBL title continued to elude them. The team suffered from ownership problems during the latter part of the 1980s, and a mass exodus of players at the end of 1987 contributed to a winless season in 1988. That same year, the team changed its name from the Cats to the Supercats. At the end of the 1988 season, a group of local business men fought to save the team, and were granted a license to ensure Geelong's ongoing participation in the NBL.

With stability restored, respected names such as Shane Heal, Brad Barnes and Jim Bateman were signed up as the team began its resurrection. It didn't take long for the Supercats to get back into the NBL finals, with a top three finish in 1991. Another exodus at the end of the 1991 season resulted in the Supercats plummeting down the ladder, again finishing last in 1992. During the mid 1990s, the team was never able to recapture the successes of previous seasons. Ultimately, the license was sold back to the NBL at the end of the 1996 season. After 15 years and 388 NBL games, the city of Geelong no longer had a representative in Australia's premier basketball competition.

ABA years
At the time of the team's departure from the NBL in 1996, the Geelong Amateur Basketball Association was fielding a strong all-Geelong based team in the Victorian Basketball League competition. This presented the opportunity for Geelong to continue its presence in a National competition by applying for entry into the Continental Basketball Association (CBA).

4 April 1997 marked Geelong's re-entry into the CBA against traditional rivals Ballarat. The first season back in the CBA was one of mixed success with the Supercats finishing just outside a finals berth with a 12-win, 12-loss record. During the 1998 season, the team took another step forward by finishing the season with a 23–8 record and came runners-up to Hobart for the South Conference title. The second-place finish entitled the Supercats to participate in the National Finals, where they lost to eventual champions Cairns in the semi-finals.

The 1999 season was a memorable one, with victory in the "Win Challenge" preseason tournament followed by a first-place finish in the South Conference with a 22–8 record. A Rodney Walker tip-in on the buzzer resulted in an 82–81 victory over Nunawading in the South Conference final. In the National Finals, wins against Cairns (94–93) and the AIS (101–92) were followed by a showdown in the final against Kilsyth in Canberra. A blistering third quarter (27–7) resulted in the Supercats cruising to its second ABA National Championship by defeating Kilsyth 98–78.

The 2000 and 2001 seasons were remarkably similar with finals appearances in both years only to be defeated by Frankston in the conference semi-finals on both occasions. The 2002 season saw the return of Mark Leader to the Supercats as head coach following a stint as a player in the late 1980s. The team produced a record of 15–9 during the year to finish the season in third place. Despite the departure of injured import Antwaan Jones at the start of the playoffs, the Supercats defeated Frankston 136–128 at home in the first round, then went on to win in the conference preliminary final with a victory over Hume City. The team went on to play in its third Conference Grand final that season, eventually losing to the AIS 111–100.

Following the retirement of Adam Lamont and the departure of Martin Price to Melbourne for work reasons, the 2003 season saw the introduction of a number of new faces into the team from the local GABA program in addition to two new American imports. The team was disrupted constantly throughout the season with injury and suspension to key players, with the team eventually settling into fourth place in the East conference with a 14–12 record. The 2003 playoff campaign was not as successful as the previous years with a semi-final loss to Hume City seeing the Supercats' season come to an end. The 2004 season saw the Supercats finish in fourth place in the East Conference with a 14–14 record. They went on to lose in the elimination semi-final before earning a wild card entry into the National Finals due to Geelong being the host venue. There the Supercats were eliminated by the Sydney Comets in the first round.

2005 was another banner year for the team. They finished the regular season as minor premiers with a 15–11 record and went on to defeat Mildura to secure the SEABL East Conference Championship. Geelong again played host to the ABA National Finals, but again lost to the Sydney Comets in the first round.

In 2006, imports Jamal Brown and Shawn Myers guided the Supercats to a second-place finish with a 17–9 record, before leading them to a 108–73 win over Canberra in the Conference Grand Final to record their second consecutive SEABL East Conference Championship. Travelling to Newcastle the following week for the ABA National Finals, the Supercats defeated QABL Champs Southern Districts and SEABL South Champs Knox on their way to meet Big V Champs Dandenong in the Grand Final. There Geelong won 94–80 to claim their second National Championship since rejoining the league in 1997.

The core group of local Geelong talent and both imports Myers and Brown were retained for the 2007 season. The team was undefeated through the first 17 games and went on to record their best ever season of 22 wins and 4 losses to secure the minor premiership. Geelong met Canberra in the 2007 Conference Grand Final, which saw the rematch go to Geelong; they won an unprecedented third straight SEABL conference title. Geelong hosted the North Adelaide Rockets in the ABA National quarter-finals and defeated them by 29 points but then were defeated by eventual National Champions, the Cairns Marlins, the following weekend in the ABA National semi-finals. 2008 was a rebuilding year for the Supercats, who saw their season end with a conference semi-final loss to Frankston.

Post-ABA years
2008 marked the end of the Australian Basketball Association, with the South East Australian Basketball League and the other four conferences disbanding from the ABA and becoming their own individual regional leagues in 2009. The Supercats started off the 2009 season with mixed results but stormed home to finish third after the regular season and then battled their way through to face Frankston for the conference championship. The all-conquering Blues were too good for the Supercats on their home court and Geelong was forced to settle for second place.

Jamie O'Loughlin took over as head coach at the start of the 2010 SEABL season. O'Loughlin retained most of the core group of players and he enticed veterans Seb Loader and Keith Harrison back out of retirement. With import Isma'il Muhammad staying on for another season, the Supercats recruited J'Nathan Bullock to the second import spot. The combination proved ultimately successful, with Geelong winning both the South Conference title against Hobart at home and following that up with a demolition of Bendigo in the SEABL National Championship final.

Following the postponement of the 2020 NBL1 South season due to the coronavirus outbreak, the Supercats withdrew from any involvement in the 2020 season.

Women's team
After winning their maiden Big V State Championship title in 2010, the Geelong Lady Cats joined forces with Basketball Geelong and became the organisation's SEABL women's program in 2011. With Paul O'Brien as inaugural head coach, he saw in an exciting new start with the Lady Supercats. The team came together with a mix of young and upcoming stars, with a number of the Geelong Big V players who had just come off winning a championship the year before joining the squad alongside WNBL veteran Deanna Smith.

In 2017, the Supercats won their first SEABL Championship with a 76–67 grand final win over the Bendigo Braves. In 2019, they reached the NBL1 grand final, where they lost 86–76 to the Kilsyth Cobras.

NBL Season by season

References

External links
 Supercats' official website

 
Sport in Geelong
South East Australian Basketball League teams
Defunct National Basketball League (Australia) teams
Basketball teams in Victoria (Australia)
Basketball teams established in 1981
1981 establishments in Australia